In the Company of Actors is a 2007 Australian documentary produced by Shark Island Productions and directed by Ian Darling.

Subject

In the Company of Actors is a documentary featuring an ensemble of Australia's finest Actors, Cate Blanchett, Hugo Weaving, Justine Clarke and Aden Young as they prepare a production of Hedda Gabler from rehearsals at Sydney Theatre Company to opening night at the Brooklyn Academy of Music (BAM) in New York.

The documentary lets the audience take a rare glimpse into the challenging creative process within the sacred space of the rehearsal room. While the action of re-staging  the play Hedda Gabler, the film also has interspersed talking heads of the cast talking about the craft of acting. The education materials also have short films from the technical crew and production staff.

It was broadcast in Australia on ABC1 February 2008.

Education and Outreach

The film and study guide package was donated to English, Drama and Media departments in all secondary schools across Australia with support from the Caledonia Foundation.  The education version of the film is available online and has specific Australian  Curriculum linked lessons developed in association with  Sydney Theatre Company.

Accolades

Official Selection 
Sydney Film Festival in 2007 ; Melbourne International Film Festival, Vancouver International Film Festival, St Tropez Internationales du Cinema des Antiodes, Santa Barbara International Film Festival, Mumbai International Film Festival, OzFliz Ontario, The London Australian Film Festival, River Run International Film Festival.

References

External links
 Official Website for the film
 
 In the Company of Actors Study Guide

2007 films
Australian documentary films
Documentary films about theatre
2000s English-language films